Hendrika Johanna van Leeuwen (July 3, 1887 – February 26, 1974) was a Dutch physicist known for her early contributions to the theory of magnetism. She studied at Leiden University under the guidance of Hendrik Antoon Lorentz, obtaining her doctorate in 1919. Her thesis  explained why magnetism is an essentially quantum mechanical effect, a result now referred to as the Bohr–Van Leeuwen theorem. (Niels Bohr had arrived at the same conclusion a few years earlier.) She continued to investigate magnetic materials at the "Technische Hogeschool Delft" (now called the Delft University of Technology), first as "assistant" between September 1920 and April 1947, and then she was promoted to "lector in de theoretische en toegepaste natuurkunde" (reader in theoretical and applied physics).

Hendrika van Leeuwen was the sister-in-law of Gunnar Nordström, known as the "Einstein of Finland", who studied in Leiden with Paul Ehrenfest, the successor of Lorentz. Her sister Cornelia (Nel) also started a PhD in Leiden, under Willem Keesom, but stopped when she married Nordström and moved with him to Helsinki.

Van Leeuwen was present at the celebration of the golden anniversary of the doctorate of Lorentz, on 11 December 1925,
and on that occasion reported on the role of Lorentz as scientist and teacher.

References

Further reading 
 , PDF at www.lorentz.leidenuniv.nl

1887 births
1974 deaths
20th-century Dutch physicists
Academic staff of the Delft University of Technology
20th-century Dutch women scientists
Dutch women physicists
Leiden University alumni
Scientists from The Hague